Naduvalur is a village in Gangavalli in the Salem district of the state of Tamil Nadu, located in the north central part of the southernmost state of India.

This is the largest panchayat in Gangavalli taluk.

Location 
Naduvalur is located 60 km from Salem, 12 km from Attur, 43 km from Perambalur and 3 km from Gangavalli. It is located on the State Highway 157 connecting Attur and Trichirapalli. Tamil is the primary language used here. This is a fast developing village in Gangavalli taluk.

Business 
Agriculture is the primary business. Other businesses are Milk products, Tractors for hire, Paddy harvesting machine for hire, medicals. There are more than 10 retailer shops available in the village which provides purchase of groceries, taking photocopies/printouts, purchasing of mobile phones, mobiles/DTH recharges, medical facilities and all other basic things.

Agriculture 
Sugarcane, Paddy, Turmeric, Maize and Cotton are main crops cultivated here. It is also famous for tapioca (cassava roots), and there are several tapioca-based industries near Attur today which manufacture products like "Javarisi" (Sago) for markets all over India. The power source is from Thedavur TNEB sub station that provides both single and 3 phase supply for domestic and agricultural purposes respectively.

Market is available on Wednesday evening (from 04:00 PM) of every week.

Panchayat Areas 
Naduvalur panchanyat includes following villages viz.

1.pallakadu

2.Mottur

3.naduvalur

Banks 
The Indian Overseas Bank (IOB) is located in this village with more than 2000 customers. It provide banking facilities for the people located in and around the villages near Naduvalur. This is core banking branch and its IFS code is IOBA0002770 used for NEFT, RTGS and IMPS finance transfer systems. The IOB ATM is operating here 24*7 to facilitate the customers for easy transactions.

The Canara Bank is located near Indian Oil petrol bunk and serving the customers from Naduvalur, Gangavalli and Pallakadu. This is core banking branch and its IFS code is CNRB0004053.

Bunk 
The Hindustan Petroleum Corporation is provide petrol/diesel facilities for the vehicles in and around the villages near Naduvalur and trespassers. It is opened from 4:00 AM to 10:00 PM.in this bunk the pump boy name is krishnan

Mobile Networks 
Maximum all networks have been used by the people in this village. 2G 3G 4G facility is available. Airtel 2G Tower is located opposite to the Bunk.

Geography 

There are two lakes in the area: Periyeri ("Big lake") and Sitheri ("Small lake"). The Periyeri will get water from Sitheri. In other words, Periyeri gets water only after Sitheri fills fully.

About Panchayat
Naduvalur panchayat comprising
Chinnamman Koil Kadu (Kattukottaigal)
Vadakkodi(Vadakku kaadu)
Chettikulam
Melveedhi (Upper Street)
Naduveedhi (Middle Street)
Keelveedhi (Lower street)

Transportation

Bus Transport 
Private buses are being operated from Attur and nearby towns/villages. Tamil Nadu State run transport corporation (TNSTC), formerly known as Anna Transport Corporation (ATC), in Salem district compete with private buses in that area. Main buses running through Naduvalur are Sri Balaji formerly Jayasakthi, Swamy Formerly SKT, KRD, ACL, 7, 10, 27, 32, 34, 15C, TNSTC (Salem, Trichy and Kumbakonam). The first bus facility during the day begins from 05:00 AM.

Railways 
The nearest railway station is Attur. Train services are also available between Attur to Salem, Attur to Virudhachalam and Salem-Chennai Egmore express that runs via Attur which arrives at 04:33 AM towards Salem and 10:20 PM towards Chennai every day. The frequency of operation is very low; one on each direction in the morning and one in the evening. Pondicherry-Bangalore AC express train is expected to run shortly and runs via Attur.

Nearest airport is Salem Airport which is 60 km away from the village, nearest International Airport is Trichy which is 95 km away from the village.

Places of Worship 
Arungattaman temple
Puthu Mariamman temple (The festival of this temple is celebrated on Vaigasi 1 (14 or 15 May) every year.
Sivan temple
Perumal temple
Periyaee temple
Veerangi Iyannar temple
Kunniyamman temple
Moopanar temple
Sunnath pallivasal(Mosque)
Mangala Mariyamman Temple (The festival of this temple is celebrated on Maasi month every year)

Education

Schools 
Government High School, Naduvalur (Up to 10th Standard)
Government Elementary School, Mottur (Up to 5th Standard)
Government Elementary School, Pallakadu (Up to 5th Standard)
Saraswathi Nursery and Primary School (Up to 5th Standard)
National Nursery and Primary School (Up to 5th Standard)
GET Academic cbse school, Naduvalur 
GET matriculation school, Naduvalur
Sri Vidhya Bharathi matric higher secondary School, Naduvalur

Colleges 
Golden Polytechnic College

Politics
Naduvalur is part of Kallakurichi in terms of Lok Shaba constituency and part of Gangavalli in terms of state assembly constituency.

Festivals 
The festival of Puthu Mariamman Temple is being celebrated every year on Vaigasi 1st (14 or 15 May).
As the village is mainly dependent on Agricultural activity Pongal festival is grandly celebrated by the people every year.

Special Economic Zones (SEZ) 
The nearest SEZ is Salem.

There is an exclusive Electrical and Electronics Industrial Estate in the Suramangalam area of Salem town.

Yercaud 
Yercaud is a hill station near Salem, Tamil Nadu, India in the Servarayan range of hills (anglicized as Shevaroys) in the Eastern Ghats. It is located 70 km from Naduvalur. It is at an altitude of 1515 metres (4969 feet) above the mean sea level. The town gets its name from the lake located at its center — in Tamil "Yeri" means "lake" and "Kaadu" means "forest". Yercaud is known for coffee plantations and orange groves. It also has an orchidarium run by the Botanical Survey of India.

The highest point in Yercaud is the Servarayan temple. Hence the Yercaud hill area is called Shevaroy Hills.

References 

Villages in Salem district